John Wheelwright Wendell (November 20, 1885 – December 1962) was an American football player. 

Wendell attended Roxbury Latin School, where he was captain of the football team. He then enrolled at Harvard University. He was a substitute halfback in 1904 and a regular at halfback in 1905. He moved to fullback in 1906. As a senior in 1907, he missed the early games due to academic troubles. When he returned, he played well enough to be selected by Walter Camp as a halfback on the 1907 College Football All-America Team. He was only five feet, nine inches, and 177 pounds in 1907. Wendell received a Bachelor of Science degree from Harvard in 1908 or 1909.

His younger brother, Percy Wendell, also starred in Harvard's backfield, from 1910 to 1912.

References

1885 births
1962 deaths
American football fullbacks
American football halfbacks
Harvard Crimson football players
All-American college football players
Roxbury Latin School alumni
Players of American football from Boston
Players of American football from Philadelphia